Walter Kollmann (17 June 1932 – 16 May 2017) was an Austrian footballer.

Career
During his club career he played for Wacker Wien. Kollmann earned 16 caps for the Austria national football team, and participated in the 1954 FIFA World Cup and the 1958 FIFA World Cup. He also represented Austria at the 1952 Summer Olympics.

References

External links

 

Walter Kollmann's obituary 

1932 births
2017 deaths
Austrian footballers
Austria international footballers
Footballers at the 1952 Summer Olympics
Olympic footballers of Austria
1954 FIFA World Cup players
1958 FIFA World Cup players
Association football defenders